, known as Phantaman or Fantomas in various countries outside Japan, is a Japanese superhero created by Suzuki Ichiro and Takeo Nagamatsu in autumn of 1930 who originally debuted in a kamishibai (paper theater). Ōgon Bat is considered by some to be the world's first superhero, and is a precursor to later superhero characters such as the Japanese kamishibai character Prince of Gamma (debut early 1930s), and the American comic book characters Superman (debut 1938) and Batman (debut 1939).

Ōgon Bat later appeared in numerous Japanese pop culture media, including manga, anime, and Japanese films, as well as toys and postage stamps dating back to 1932. It was adapted into a popular anime television series in 1967, which was released in various European and Latin American countries.

History

Ōgon Bat was created by 16-year-old Takeo Nagamatsu and 25-year-old Suzuki Ichiro in 1931, and was named after the Golden Bat cigarette brand. The two were inspired by drawings of mythological characters in Tokyo's Ueno Royal Museum to create a new hero based on science rather than mythology. The character debuted in a kamishibai, a type of traveling show in which a sequence of pictures are shown, narrated by a storyteller. The character was popular enough to survive the decline of kamishibai following World War II, and was eventually adapted into manga (including one by Osamu Tezuka) and anime.

The character featured in three live-action movies: Ôgon Bat: Matenrô no Kaijin, released in 1950; Ôgon Batto, released in 1966; and the comedy biopic Ôgon Batto ga Yattekuru, released in 1972. He also appeared in a 52-episode anime series that aired on Nippon TV from 1967 to 1968.

In December 2022 a new manga adaptation illustrated by Kazutoshi Yamane was launched in Champion Red magazine by Akita Shoten.

Character description
Ōgon Bat is a being from ancient Atlantis who was sent forward in time 10,000 years to battle evil forces threatening the present day. He has a golden skull-shaped head, wears a green and white swashbuckler outfit with a high-collared red cape, and carries a rapier. He lives in a fortress in the Japanese Alps. His superpowers include superhuman strength, invulnerability, and the ability to fly. Ōgon Bat has an evil counterpart known as Kurayami Bat (暗闇バット "Dark Bat"). His main enemy is Dr. Erich Nazō (ナゾー), the leader of a crime syndicate bent on world domination, who wears a black costume and mask with bat-like ears, a red eye and a blue eye.

Film

Plot
When young Akira Kazahaya spots the rogue planet Icarus on a collision course for Earth, he is recruited by Captain Yamatone into the Pearl Research Institute in the Japanese Alps, secretly an U.N. organization that protects the Earth, who is searching for the final component to complete Dr. Pearl's Super Destruction Beam Cannon to destroy Icarus. When Captain Yamatone's unit, along with Akira and Pearl's granddaughter Emily, searches for the material for the lens on a mysterious island they soon realize is Atlantis, they are attacked by the evil forces of the Ruler of the Universe Nazō (ナゾー) in a drill-shaped tower ship, who is the one who sent Icarus towards Earth, and force Yamatone to retreat into an ancient tomb holding a sarcophagus with a prophecy that after 10,000 years, a crisis will inevitably come and to awaken the one within to fight it. Just as Nazō's men burst in and try and surround the institute's people, Emily places water on Ogon Bat's chest and revives him. Laughing, Ogon Bat sizes up the situation, defeats the alien attackers and sends a bat to Emily, which turns into a pin, allowing her to call him when there is danger. Ogon Bat then fights off Nazō's tower, allowing Yamatone and the institute people to return with the lens.

Undeterred, Nazō gathers his three top agents, Viper, Piranha, and Jackal, who he sends to infiltrate the Institute and retrieve the lens and the beam cannon using their own unique abilities. Nazō successfully captures Dr. Pearl, Emily, and the Super Destruction Beam, but is frustrated by his minions' inability to find the lens and Dr. Pearl's resistance to interrogation, Pearl realizing far more than Earth would be in danger if a villain like Nazō were to gain the weapon, until he realizes Yamatone gave the lens to Ogon Bat, and Nazō tricks Emily into calling for him, resulting in a climactic battle with the fate of Earth at stake.

Cast
 Sonny Chiba as 
 Wataru Yamakawa as Akira Kazahaya
 Hisako Tsukuba as Naomi Akiyama
 Emiri Takami as Emily Beard
 Andrew Hughes as Dr. Parl
 Hirohisa Nakada as agent Shimizu
 Kōsaku Okano as agent Nakamura
 Kouji Sekiyama as Nazō
 Youichi Numada as Keroido / Viper
 Keiko Kuni as Perania / Piranha
 Keiichi Kitakawa as Jackal
 Yukio Aoshima as police officer

Anime

 is an anime television series released in 1967. It was released internationally in a number of countries under various titles including Phantaman and Fantomas. The anime series was very popular in many European and Latin American countries.

List of anime episodes

References

External links

1950 films
1960s Japanese films
1960s superhero films
1966 films
1967 anime television series debuts
Alien invasions in films
Anime and manga characters with superhuman strength
Comics characters introduced in 1931
Fictional Atlanteans
Fictional bats
Fictional skeletons
Fictional stick-fighters
Japanese science fiction action films
Japanese superhero films
Japanese superheroes
Nippon TV original programming
Superheroes in anime and manga
Television superheroes
Toei tokusatsu films
Yomiuri Telecasting Corporation original programming
1950s Japanese films